Ronald Kyle Clifton (born August 23, 1962) is a former American football linebacker who played 13 seasons in the National Football League (NFL) for the New York Jets. After playing college football for TCU, he was drafted by the Jets in the third round (64th overall) of the 1984 NFL Draft.

He led the NFL in solo tackles with 160 in 1985, 174 in 1986 and 162 in 1988. Additionally, he was in the top 10 of NFL solo tacklers in 1984, 1985, 1986, 1988, 1989, 1990, and 1991. He announced his retirement on February 14, 1997. At the time of his retirement, he was the second-leading tackler in NFL history and remains the Jets' all-time leading tackler. Clifton made 1,484 tackles over the course of his professional career ranking him 10th overall in combined tackles since 1987. Clifton attended high school in Bridgeport, Texas.

References

1962 births
Living people
People from Olney, Texas
Players of American football from Texas
American football linebackers
TCU Horned Frogs football players
New York Jets players
Ed Block Courage Award recipients